is a train station in Akiha-ku, Niigata, Niigata Prefecture, Japan.

Lines

Layout

The station consists of two ground-level opposed side platforms serving two tracks, with the station situated above the tracks.

Platforms

History
The station opened on 16 March 1991.

Passenger statistics
In fiscal 2017, the station was used by an average of 987 passengers daily (boarding passengers only).

References

External links

 JR East station information 

Railway stations in Niigata (city)
Shin'etsu Main Line
Railway stations in Japan opened in 1991